The Annals of Saudi Medicine is a bimonthly peer-reviewed medical journal published by the King Faisal Specialist Hospital and Research Centre (Riyadh, Saudi Arabia). It was established in 1981 as the King Faisal Specialist Hospital Medical Journal and obtained its current name in 1985. Publication frequency increased from quarterly to bimonthly in 1988. The editor-in-chief is Nasser Al-Sanea (King Faisal Specialist Hospital and Research Centre).

Abstracting and indexing 
The journal is abstracted and indexed in:

According to the Journal Citation Reports, the journal had a 2021 impact factor of 1.707 and a 5-year impact factor of 2.057. The journal has been in the Thomson-Reuters  database since 1997. In May 2019, the journal website converted to the Atypon Literatum online publishing platform.

References

External links 
 

Open access journals
General medical journals
Bimonthly journals
English-language journals
Publications established in 1981